Limborelia is a genus in the subfamily Omphalotropidinae of palmleaf snails that is endemic to Australia's Lord Howe Island in the Tasman Sea.

Species
Species in the genus include:
 Limborelia exquisita (Pfeiffer, 1855)
 Limborelia innesi (Iredale, 1944)

References

 
 
Taxa named by Tom Iredale
Gastropod genera
Gastropods of Lord Howe Island